The Macquarie River (Indigenous palawa kani: tinamarakunah(pron. teen.ner.mair.rer.koon.ner)) is a major perennial river located in the Midlands region of Tasmania, Australia.

Location and features
The Macquarie River rises below Tooms Lake, near Hobgoblin and  flows generally south and then north-west and through the town of Ross before reaching its confluence with the South Esk River near . The Tooms, Blackman, Elizabeth, Isis and Lake rivers all are tributaries of the Macquarie. The river descends  over its  course.

The traditional custodians of the Macquarie River Valley were the Tyerrernotepanner (chera-noti-pahner) Clan of the North Midlands Nation. The Tyerrernotepanner were a nomadic people who traversed country from the Central Plateau to the Eastern Tiers but were recorded as inhabiting 'resorts' in the Macquarie Valley at Ross, Ellenthorpe Hall, Glen Morriston and Tooms Lake/moyentaliah.

See also

 Rivers of Tasmania

References

Rivers of Tasmania
Midlands (Tasmania)